The Memphis Area Transit Authority (MATA) is the public transportation provider for Memphis, Tennessee. It is one of the largest transit providers in the state of Tennessee; MATA transports customers in the City of Memphis and parts of Shelby County on fixed-route buses, paratransit vehicles, demand-responsive service, and the MATA Trolley system. The system is managed by a seven-member policy board appointed by the mayor and approved by the Memphis City Council.

History 
MATA was established by a city ordinance on May 13, 1975 to replace the Memphis Transit Authority. The change increased the size of the board from three members to seven and gave the board the authority to hire a management firm to run the company. Purchasing power was transferred from the MTA purchasing department to a city purchasing agent.

In the past, its roster included GM TDH-5300 and TDH-4500 "New Looks" and Flxible 40-102 New Look series (carryovers from its predecessor), AM General 40 ft., MAN articulateds, the RTS series from GM, TMC and NovaBus, Neoplan artics, and NovaBus LFS low floors buses. The RTS series were MATA's preferred fleet of choice, having been used in its lineup from February 1980 until its retirement in April 2010, when the six remaining 1994 NovaBus versions were replaced with the Gillig Advantage Hybrids. MATA hopes to shift to a hybrid fleet in the future.

Transit Vision 
Development for the Memphis 3.0 Transit Vision started in 2017, in association with the Memphis 3.0 Comprehensive Plan. The process was split into three phases which surveyed the existing conditions of the network and city, contrasted the different options for transit networks, and created a draft recommended network for stakeholder feedback. The final report was completed in March 2019. It included both a short-term recommended network to be implemented in 2022 as well as a long-term network to be implemented by 2040.

In 2019, the U.S. DOT awarded MATA a $12 million grant to fund the design and construction of the Memphis Innovation Corridor. The final design consisted of an eight-mile BRT line running from downtown to the University of Memphis and using battery-electric buses. MATA received another $76 million in 2022 for purchasing the BRT busses and constructing maintenance and charging stations for them.

Operations

Rail 

Initially opened in 1993, the Main Street Trolley Line uses classic streetcars on a system that has grown to three routes: one along the riverfront, another serving Main Street in the heart of downtown Memphis, and an extension on Madison Avenue.  The Madison Avenue line opened in 2004, as the initial stage of a light rail system that would connect downtown Memphis with the Memphis International Airport and eventually to regional transit service beyond the MATA service boundaries.

Service was replaced by buses after two trolleys caught fire in late 2013 and early 2014. After nearly four years, the Main Street Trolley Line was reinstated in 2018.

Currently, MATA offers trolley line services seven days a week. The Main Street Line operates trolleys with 12-minute headways throughout the day. The Riverfront Line and Madison Line operate buses with 40-minute and 30-minute headways respectively.

MATA has 5 operable trolleys, but only 4 are operated at a time.

Bus 
MATA operates 24 fixed-route bus routes. On MATA's system map, bus routes are organized into three categories based on rush hour frequency: high frequency routes have 30 minute weekday frequency, medium frequency routes have 60 minute weekday frequency, and low frequency routes have greater than 60 minute weekday frequency.

The MATA fixed-route fleet consists of 122 Gillig Advantage Low Floor buses. All of the buses have bike racks on the front of the vehicle. They are also all equipped with WiFi.

MATAplus 
MATAplus is a shared ride paratransit service designed to meet the transportation needs of persons with disabilities in the Memphis service area. The service covers the same area as the MATA bus system and operate during the same days and hours as the fixed-route bus system in the same area. The service area extends three-fourths (3/4) of a mile beyond the fixed-routes, which means that anywhere beyond the area mentioned can not qualify for MATAplus services. Two types of services are offered through MATAplus: Advance/Demand Response, which allows riders to book reservations in advance, and a subscription service that allows riders to use the service to take them to their destination and back.

On-Demand 
Groove On-Demand is an on-demand service launched in February 2021. It is the successor to MATA and the Memphis Medical District Collaborative (MMDC)'s Route 500 commuter bus. The current service also includes the Downtown Memphis Commission as a major supporter. Groove serves Downtown, the Medical District, New Chicago, and President's Island. Groove operates using software from Via Transportation.

Ready! by MATA is an on-demand service launched in August 2021. It is a one-year pilot program that was implemented as a part of Transit Vision. Ready! serves three zones. Zone 1 covers the neighborhoods of Boxtown, Westwood, and Whitehaven. Zone 2 consists of Northaven and Frayser. Zone 3 in mostly in Cordova. Reservations works similarly to ride hailing services, but payments can be made through the GO901 app or in-person with cash. Fares are the same as fixed route buses. Ready! operates Monday-Saturday, 6am-7pm.

Fares 
MATA charges a flat fare for all trips. Since June 20, 2020, the full fare is $1 and the senior/disabled fare is $0.50. MATA also offers a Daily Fast Pass for $2 ($1 for seniors and disabled individuals), but hasn't offered 7-day or 31-day passes since the beginning of the COVID-19 pandemic. Up to three kids under 5 can board for free with fare-paying rider.

In September 2020 MATA launched GO901, a mobile fare app that allows users to purchase fares and day passes using debit and credit cards. In conjunction with the app, MATA started offering free WiFi on vehicles starting in December 2019.

Ridership 
In 2021, MATA served a total of approximately 5.4 million passengers. Of those passengers, approximately 70,000 were from the trolley system and 1.1 million were from MATAplus.

Facilities 
MATA owns three transit centers, two of which have parking, and one park-and-ride lot. MATA also designates several malls as informal park-and-ride lots on its map.

Maintenance 
MATA owns two facilities at which it maintains its buses, trolleys, and other road vehicles. The Trolley Operations and Maintenance facility is located at 547 North Main Street. The road vehicle maintenance facility is located at 1370 Levee Road.

References

External links 

Official website
https://transitvision.memphistn.gov/
https://memphisinnovationcorridor.com/
1979 TV story on the "Hustle Bus" at YouTube

Bus transportation in Arkansas
Bus transportation in Tennessee
Government agencies established in 1975
1975 establishments in Tennessee
Heritage streetcar systems
Intermodal transportation authorities in Tennessee
Intermodal transportation authorities in Arkansas
Transportation in Memphis, Tennessee
Transit agencies in Arkansas